Lucas Suárez may refer to:

 Lucas Suárez (footballer, born 1984), Argentine footballer
 Lucas Suárez (footballer, born 1995), Argentine footballer